Stephenson College may refer to:

Stephenson College, Coalville
Stephenson College, Durham